Monanthocitrus oblanceolata is a species of flowering plant in the citrus family, Rutaceae. It is endemic to Sabah in Malaysia. It was first described in 1988.

References

oblanceolata
Endemic flora of Borneo
Flora of Sabah
Vulnerable plants
Plants described in 1988
Taxonomy articles created by Polbot